This is a list of Ice Road Truckers Season 1 episodes. 

The series premiered on June 17, 2007. Six ice road truckers are introduced, and are described as men driving eighteen-wheelers who haul equipment and supplies from Yellowknife, Canada, across a temporary road composed of portages and frozen lakes, to one of three diamond mines northeast of Yellowknife. The final episode in season one premiered on August 19, 2007.

Drivers

Hugh 'The Polar Bear' Rowland (born 1957): A very rough-around-the-edges, 20-year veteran of ice-road trucking, based in Kelowna in southern British Columbia. He is of French descent and claims to be known by the ice road trucking community as "The Polar Bear", which he says refers to his overbearing, annoying personality, bearish attitude, stamina, and consistently high number of loads delivered per season. Rowland owns four trucks and drives one; the other three are manned by ice road rookies Drew Sherwood, Todd White, and Rowland's associate and year-round employee Rick Yemm. Rowland's trucks all have the emblem R&R Hoe Service on the doors – the company Rowland owns in Kelowna (actually Winfield, BC).

During the course of Season 1, all three of Rowland's hired drivers end up prematurely leaving the ice road. White was banished for excessive speeding (episode 5), Yemm left following heated disagreements about the working condition of Rowland's trucks (episode 9), and Sherwood left after several vehicle breakdowns (episode 7).

Rowland's truck is called "The Crow's Nest" and is kept in good condition, as was Yemm's truck, besides the heater (as seen throughout the season). The trucks driven by Sherwood and White had a multitude of mechanical problems. After Sherwood's departure, Rowland hired a fourth driver named Danny Reese. In the final episode of the first season, Rowland's luck finally ran out when his truck was sideswiped by another trucker on the ice road, knocking a driving axle off the chassis. He ended up finishing the season in the truck originally driven by Yemm.

Rick Yemm: One of Rowland's employees. This brash, tattooed trucker, also from Kelowna, was in his second year as an ice road trucker during Season 1. In 2006, Yemm was one of the first truckers onto the ice road after it opened when, according to him, the sound of cracking ice was loudest. This stressful experience almost caused him to quit driving the ice road right then and there. He decided to continue, however, remarking, "I was too stupid and too stubborn to quit."

During Season 1, the floor heater in his truck was malfunctioning. This was a major source of tension between Rowland, the truck's owner, and Yemm, who expected Rowland to take care of the problem so that he could continue hauling loads without risking severe frostbite. Yemm ultimately quit and returned home, feeling his friend was not fulfilling his responsibilities to maintain the trucks.

Yemm is known for being hard on the trucks by constantly beating on them. In one episode, Yemm is seen bouncing up and down, pumping the accelerator pedal up and down, and messing with the steering wheel, all the while facing the camera and saying "yee-haw motha fucker!"

Alex Debogorski: A legend in the ice road trucking community, and 2007 marked Debogorski's 26th year as an ice road trucker. Debogorski has 11 children and nine grandchildren, and is a year-round resident of Yellowknife. As stated in Season 1, since he has been a staple driving the ice roads, it is something of a good-luck charm for Debogorski to pull the first load over the ice roads at the beginning of every season. He is such a devout Catholic that by season 9, when he joined long-time rival Hugh Rowland's company in Canada, Debogorski had "The Preacher Man" emblazoned on the side of his truck. (Polish Dębogórski means "coming from or living at Oak Mountain".)

In Season 2, Debogorski had to leave early because of illness (a pulmonary embolism) as seen in episode 8, "A Trucker’s Farewell".

Jay Westgard: Westgard is also a year-round resident of Yellowknife. Despite his relative youth (he is 25 years old), Westgard is considered by the ice road community as the most talented driver of his generation (as mentioned in the premiere). He began driving trucks at age 16 and owned his first truck by age 18; at the time of his introduction on IRT, Westgard had acquired a reputation as a driver who excels in hauling oversized loads. Because of his experience, he is entrusted with delivering some of the more demanding loads, such as a 48-ton ore scrubber. He also agrees to drive in a convoy (led by Mike Kimball) hauling vital jet fuel to remote Deline—a job most veterans would turn down because the trip is very risky.
T.J. Tilcox: A 21-year-old ice road rookie, Tilcox is vocal about how he hates the cold and ice, and explains that he is driving on the ice road for the experience, not the money. Tilcox has been trucking since age 16 and decided to try ice road trucking after seeing an advertisement in the newspaper. Early on he struggles with an older truck that lacks heat, but another driver grants Tilcox the use of his brand-new Volvo truck leased to Trinity Transport. On his first run in the new truck, Tilcox gets in an accident before ever hitting the ice road, due to the brake service line's disconnecting from his trailer. Tilcox is ultimately cleared of responsibility and, after a delay, allowed back on the road.

After the accident Tilcox is injured while tying down a load, and several days later experiences severe abdominal pain which becomes so bad that he has to be flown out to receive medical care. Tilcox is able to return to the ice roads after being treated for his injuries. The expense of his treatment is highlighted on the show as a cause of concern for Tilcox. Despite his ordeals, Tilcox gains respect for the job and the people who do it, as well as self-satisfaction for having completed the entire season — a rare feat for a rookie (as mentioned in the finale). He leaves with the respect and admiration of his fellow ice road veterans.

Drew Sherwood: Sherwood is a veteran trucker but an ice road rookie. He joined Rowland's team after answering an advertisement in the local newspaper. Early on, Sherwood expresses a high degree of confidence that he will have no problems adjusting from highway to ice driving. Rowland considers Sherwood an arrogant rookie and a "one year driver". In the series premiere, Sherwood states: "I have no intention of going into a ditch, bro", after which he soon gets stuck in a ditch later in that episode, a humbling lesson in how much respect the ice road demands.

Sherwood's hard luck, unfortunately, did not stop there, and he was plagued with a frustrating amount of mechanical problems. For starters, he loses his battery box and batteries (resulting in two days lost while a replacement box is fabricated on the spot), suffers a flat tire, and then experiences problems with his truck's on-board computer that forces him to abandon a load on the roadside. Sherwood ends up driving the truck of expelled driver Todd White just to pick up where he left off, yet ends up suffering through problems in that truck, as well (as seen in episode 7). Hugh Rowland, the truck's owner, and Lee Parkinson, Rowland's mechanic, blamed many of these mechanical problems squarely on Sherwood. Sherwood ultimately decides enough is enough and leaves the ice roads to return home.
Todd White: White (aka "Chains") worked for Hugh Rowland. He comes from Canada's eastern coast, and is a self-proclaimed trucker and singer. He responded to an ad that Rowland placed and was hired as part of his crew after a seven-year absence from ice road trucking. One of the main reasons White returned to ice road trucking was the need to earn $20,000 to repair his own truck. White appealed, claiming that he missed a speed limit sign, but his appeal was denied. After White left, Sherwood drove his truck.
Danny Reese: Shortly after Sherwood's departure, Rowland hired Reese to take over the truck vacated by Sherwood after it had finally received a new ECM (as seen in episode 8). Reese quickly noticed that the truck "had its quirks", which included problems with the truck's turbo similar to those Sherwood had experienced with this truck.

Support personnel

Tom Tweed: Tweed is a dispatcher for Tli Cho Landtran in Yellowknife.
Rick Fitch: Fitch is a projects manager for Tli Cho Landtran, responsible for scheduling client loads. He is seen responding to several accidents in the series. Fitch has been working on the ice road for over 20 years.
Ken Murray: Murray is an officer for Secure Check, the organization responsible for security and rules enforcement on the ice road. A first-time speeding ticket can result in a five-day suspension, while severe infractions (including excessive speed) can lead to a driver's being banned for the rest of the season. Truck weights are also checked to ensure they will not over-stress the ice; a driver with an overweight truck can be fined several hundred dollars.
Lee Parkinson: Parkinson operates a garage in Yellowknife. He is the busiest mechanic in the north (as mentioned in the premiere) and works with his journeyman Mark Chang.
Neil McDougall: Safety and Compliance Supervisor with Tli Cho Landtran. His job is to set up and hire all the drivers and trucks for the winter road, and to monitor and police the drivers on the road so that rules are not violated and the truckers are not kicked off the road.

Route and destinations

Tibbitt to Contwoyto Winter Road: The first portion of the road is on pavement, following the Ingraham Trail for roughly  until it reaches the shore of Tibbitt Lake.
 Yellowknife, Northwest Territories: Loads are assigned here.
 Dome Lake Camp: A maintenance camp, located  past the start of the ice portion of the winter road. Tilcox is forced to stop here when his injury flares up; he is then airlifted back to Yellowknife for treatment (episode 7).
 Lockhart Lake Rest Stop: Lockhart provides catering and other services for truckers.
The road continues roughly  past here, serving two defunct mines and stopping at the north end of Contwoyto Lake in Nunavut.
 Colomac Mine: A closed gold mine that was recently cleaned up due to the risk the mine's toxic materials presented to the environment. Now that the cleanup is finished, truckers (including Debogorski) are being called in to haul away equipment.
 Tundra Mine: A gold mine that stopped production in 1968 and is now undergoing environmental cleanup. Equipment from the Colomac Mine is being transferred here to assist workers with the cleanup.
 Deline, Northwest Territories: A small village, on the shore of Great Bear Lake, that depends on jet fuel shipments over the ice road to keep its airport operating.

Final load counts
The season was one of the most successful so far, with 10,922 loads totaling 331,000 tonnes (730 million pounds, or 365,000 U.S. tons) delivered. (Note: The total shown on screen is 662,000,000 pounds, corresponding to 331,000 US tons.)

Controversy and changes
The mining companies that owned the road where the first season was filmed felt the show portrayed the road in a negative fashion. They believed the show depicted drivers as cowboys making a mad dash for money and taking excessive risks to do so. Also, the companies felt the cameras and filming created distractions for the drivers. As a result, the owners decided not to participate in future seasons of the show, and a new rule for the Tibbitt to Contwoyto Winter Roads was enacted for the 2008 season, prohibiting commercial, media, video, or rolling film cameras either inside or attached to the outside of vehicles. In response, the show's producers located an alternate ice road for season 2.

There were several differences in style among Seasons 1, 2, and 3:
 A main theme of Season 1 was "the dash for the cash", which was rarely mentioned in Season 2, but is a main theme in Season 3.
 In Season 1, companies' insignia on trucks and men's safety helmets were routinely blurred out. In Season 2, they were left visible.

Episodes

Specials

Three additional one-hour specials ran in the weeks following "The Final Run". Then and Now premiered on August 26, 2007 and provided a look into the development and future of Canada's ice roads. Clips from season 1 were featured, as well as further commentary from Rowland, Debogorski, and road pioneer John Denison. Off the Ice premiered on September 2, 2007, bringing all six truckers together for a chance to express their thoughts about the job and each other. On the Edge premiered on September 9, 2007, continuing the discussion and exploring the truckers' lives during the off season.

A fourth special, The Road to Season 2, aired on June 1, 2008. This hour presented highlights from the first season and gave a preview of things to come in the second one.

References 

 
2007 American television seasons
Ice Road Truckers seasons